John Walter "Duster" Mails (October 1, 1894 – July 5, 1974) was an American pitcher in Major League Baseball for the Brooklyn Robins (1915–16), Cleveland Indians (1920–22) and St. Louis Cardinals (1925–26).

Mails pitched for three pennant winning teams—the 1916 Robins, the 1920 Indians and the 1926 Cardinals. He appeared in only 11 games for the 1916 Robins, with a record of 0–1, and did not appear in the 1916 World Series, which the Robins lost.

He helped the Indians win the 1920 World Series after being acquired in a minor league trade in August 1920, appearing in 9 games while posting a record of 7-0 and an ERA of 1.85 as the Indians battled the Chicago White Sox and New York Yankees in a tight pennant race. He pitched 6.2 innings of relief in Game 3 of the World Series, allowing no runs. He pitched a 1-0 complete game shutout of Brooklyn in Game 6 and posted a 0.00 ERA for his two Series appearances.

He appeared in only one game for the 1926 Cardinals, posting a record of 0–1, and did not pitch in the 1926 World Series, which the Cardinals won.

In seven Major League seasons, Mails had a 32–25 win–loss record, 104 games, 59 games started, 29 complete games, 5 shutouts, 26 games finished, 2 saves, 516 innings pitched, 554 hits allowed, 281 runs allowed, 235 earned runs allowed, 27 home runs allowed, 220 walks allowed, 232 strikeouts, 13 hit batsmen, 7 wild pitches, 2288 batters faced, and a 4.10 ERA.

Mails won over 200 games in the minor leagues, primarily in the Pacific Coast League during the 1920s, posting a record of 226–210.

Born in San Quentin, California, Mails graduated from Christian Brothers High School (Sacramento, California) and attended Saint Mary's College of California. He died in San Francisco, California, at the age of 79.

Sources

1894 births
1974 deaths
Major League Baseball pitchers
Brooklyn Robins players
Cleveland Indians players
St. Louis Cardinals players
Minor league baseball managers
Seattle Giants players
Portland Beavers players
Sacramento Senators players
Seattle Rainiers players
Oakland Oaks (baseball) players
San Francisco Seals (baseball) players
Syracuse Stars (minor league baseball) players
Chattanooga Lookouts players
Kansas City Blues (baseball) players
Saint Mary's Gaels baseball players
Baseball players from California
People from Marin County, California